Acuitzeramo is a small town located in the municipality of Tlazazalca in the Mexican state of Michoacán. 
 Acuitzeramo, Michoacán
 Acuitzeramo at PueblosAmerica.com

History

Acultzeramo, Mpio. Tlazazalca. The inhabitants of the towns of Villa Mendoza, also known as old houses, and Acuitzeramo now struggle to get rid of these ties that have prevented progress and achieve a better standard of living.

In effect, during the last years the 2 populations have gradually left even its rural appearance to become urban populations of modern housing with services and urban equipment indispensable to improve their conditions of collective and family life.

No doubt that in good part that favorable urban transformation that can be seen is related to the high rate of emigration suffering towards the United States, where whole families are forced to move in search of better job opportunities that do not have on their land.

Important injection of resources from émigrés and the desire of these improve the appearance of its people, their homes and the living conditions of their families have to do with the transformation that suffer from these villages.

This is seen in the gradual replacement of the adobe houses, tile and wood by, in many cases, true modern residences of septum with plasters and concrete vault. Also seen in the improvement of areas such as streets, temples and plazas.

Is even observed in commitment to recent to achieve better communication with the outside through paved access road and automatic instant telephone communication with emigrated family living thousands of miles from here.

Before, these 2 communities, despite being close to major towns, were ignored. They were cut off. The only channel of communication they had were roads of have usually in bad conditions and poor phone service through telephone booths that only operated part of the day.

Before to communicate by telephone with the outside was a real Odyssey. First because the telephone booths not operating so regularly during the day and at night the service it was suspending. Second, because even though they had access to the phone booths make to communicate with the outside was hard by the frequency that the lines were busy or suffered damage.

Communities, both arising from the development of farms in each case, have as one of the main activities of the livestock. Agriculture, the precarious quality of lands and by the limited space with agricultural vocation, occupies a secondary position in the local economy.

Previously two gentlemen in each district to meet voluntary cooperation, according to the expenses that would be, both the cost of the band as Castle; later a gru po 5 men formed the e1 development of party Committee, agreement of the civil authority, who has always supported, and give us the necessary guarantees so that everything goes well. Usually invites Mr. Obispo for confirmations, usually some first communions, there are evening Serenade. People not you like that they are carried across music, in particular basketball game; all finished, the priest makes in public a box cut. People like to know who gave and who did not. This is the party of February 2, in honour of St. Nicolás Tolentino and the Santísima Virgen del Refugio.

Acuitzeramo, Michoacán located Northwest of Purepero. It is headquarters of the municipality of Tlazazalca holding currently has two access roads: a part of Purepero, passing by the jump, Villa Mendoza, with an area of about 10 km.; the other that goes Purepero. Tlazazalca, mint, San. Isidro and Acuitzeramo, which is normally in the best conditions. Approximate population: 6,000 inhabitants; temperate climate.

The most important civil holiday so far has been on November 20, for which candidates to Queen of the holidays, parade, speeches and at night there is a dance; It is the joy of small and large. In e1 educational field ripped off two primary schools, the Benito Juárez and Ignacio Zaragoza, both full training, i.e. have asta sixth year, a TELESECUNDARIA, whose building is under construction, and had a bright start under the direction of the master and LIC Julio Santoyo Guerrero; currently need to inject new forces and better organization

there is also a kindergarten, which sometimes worked and sometimes not, I think that with the departure to the United States schools suffer from serious alterations in attendance say, many children register and gradually go missing, precisely because of the problem of emigration.

From time immemorial, Acultzeramo celebrated the 4th of July in honour to the Santísima Virgen del Refugio, as the employer fiesta of the people. It was not until few years ago, when residents began to emigrate to the United States, he moved to February 2, date in which they returned to their land of vacation; and it is during the months of November–March when people do all their religious celebrations: baptisms, confirmations, first communions, weddings, etc. The population since the beginning of the century was divided into 5 districts "colonies" as I was formerly called him. They are: El Barrio of the Drum, The Serratos El Barrio, Del Pedregal Neighborhood, Neighborhood of Los Ruices Neighborhood of El Bajío. They receive these names, by their geographical configuration or the prevalence of a surname. Acultzeramo, according to Lic. Romero Flores, in his dictionary Michoacano, decode it as well: Acuitze: Snake; was: verb look; and very particle that designates mouth or cliff edge: "snake on the edge of a cliff".

A film under the same name "Acuitzeramo" was filmed in this town in January of 2019.  The film premiered at the prestigious Morelia International Film festival and won Best Short at the Sedona International Film Festival.  It also won Best LGBTQ Short at The American Pavilion at the Cannes Film Festival.  It has screened in festivals all over the world including the Washington DC International Film Festival, Los Angeles Latino International Film Festival, Barcelona International LGTIB Film Festival, Inside Out in Toronto Canada, and Outfest Fusion in Los Angeles. The film was directed by Miguel Angel Caballero and stars actors Sal Lopez, Luis Aldana and Matias Ponce.  The film is about an elderly gay man who loses his partner of 15 years, it is produced by Cabaldana Alchemy.  The director of the film was raised in this town and spent his childhood here, traveling back and forth form the US to Acuitzeramo.

Festivals
Acuitzeramo is best known for their jaripeo (rodeo) which takes place every New Years Day, January 1. This event is taken place in the Lienzo Charro "Los Encinos" in the barrio of "El Bajio." Many people from the town and places nearby go with their families for some good entertainment that consist of bull riding and live music, mainly banda. After the entertainment is over, people walk to the town square (plaza) accompanied with the banda which plays for several hours more before the night ends.

In honor of St. Nicholas Tolentine (San Nicolas de Tolentino), patron saint of the town parish, Acuitzeramo celebrates every  January 2nd. The celebration begins with the traditional mañanitas followed by an alborada, which is a walk around the whole town at dawn, that ends in the town square (plaza). There is live entertainment of a banda playing were people gather to dance and eat breakfast. This is followed by a small peregrination from the beginning of the town to the parish, where they receive the bishop and hold a mass. During the mass there are confirmations as well as first communions being received. Afterwards there are a few regional dance performances, followed by a night entertainment with more live music and the lighting of a castillo, a tower of fireworks.     

 

Populated places in Michoacán